Jake Turpin (born 16 November 1996) is an Australian professional rugby league footballer who plays as a  for the Sydney Roosters in the NRL.

He previously for the Brisbane Broncos in the National Rugby League.

Background
Turpin was born in Brisbane, Queensland, Australia.

He played his junior rugby league for Redlands and the Ipswich Brothers, before being signed by the Melbourne Storm.

Playing career

Early years
From 2014 to 2016, Turpin played for the Melbourne Storm NYC team, playing 44 games scoring 9 tries and kicking one field goal before graduating to their Queensland Cup team, Sunshine Coast Falcons in 2017.

2018
In 2018, Turpin joined the Brisbane Broncos. In round 17 of the 2018 NRL season, he made his NRL debut for the Broncos against the Gold Coast Titans, starting off the interchange bench after regular hooker Andrew McCullough was called up to the Queensland State of Origin team.

2019
Turpin played 15 games for Brisbane in the 2019 NRL season including the club's 58-0 loss against Parramatta in the elimination final.

2020
Turpin played six games for Brisbane in the 2020 NRL season due to a broken leg and a broken hand injuries suffered, as the club finished last on the table and claimed their first ever wooden spoon.

2021
In round 10, Turpin captained his first game for the Brisbane club stepping in for Alex Glenn and Patrick Carrigan who were both injured.  Brisbane would go on to lose the match 50-6 against Manly-Warringah.

References

External links
Brisbane Broncos profile

1996 births
Living people
Australian rugby league players
Brisbane Broncos captains
Brisbane Broncos players
Sydney Roosters players
Rugby league hookers
Redcliffe Dolphins players
Rugby league halfbacks
Rugby league players from Brisbane
Sunshine Coast Falcons players